Andre Stefan McCollin (born 26 March 1985) is an English footballer who plays for Whyteleafe.

Career 
Born in Lambeth, London, McCollin spent one season with Fisher Athletic joining from Corinthian Casuals, where he scored 19 goals in 2006–07. McCollin made his Football League debut coming off the bench for Yeovil Town against Hereford United in August 2008.

McCollin signed for Grays Athletic on loan in November 2008. He made his debut in the 1–1 FA Cup first round draw with Carlisle United on 8 November 2008.

McCollin signed on loan for Dorchester Town in October 2009. He made his debut and in the process scored a goal in the 3–1 loss to Dover Athletic on 31 October 2009.

On 12 February 2010, McCollin joined Farnborough on loan.

He was released along with three other players on 13 May 2010 by Yeovil, and then returned to Farnborough on a non-contract basis before leaving again after only two substitute appearances.

He joined his home-town side Croydon Athletic in August 2010, coming on as substitute on 28 August, in the 65th minute, before being carried off injured after 15 minutes.

As of 20 August 2012, McCollin was playing for Kingstonian. He signed for Aldershot Town in October 2014.

He started the 2015–16 season with Cray Wanderers and made an immediate impact, scoring five goals in his first four games. He joined Tonbridge Angels for the start of the 2016–17 season. In the opening match of the season at home to Wingate & Finchley he scored after 25 minutes on his debut but suffered a broken fibula 10 minutes later. McCollin scored on his return from injury on 11th Feb 2017 netting a last minute penalty in a 4–1 win over Grays Athletic.

On 19 January 2019, McCollin signed with Whyteleafe FC.

References

External links 

Andre McCollin at Footballdatabase

1985 births
Living people
Footballers from Lambeth
English footballers
Association football forwards
Corinthian-Casuals F.C. players
Fisher Athletic F.C. players
Yeovil Town F.C. players
Grays Athletic F.C. players
Dorchester Town F.C. players
Farnborough F.C. players
Croydon Athletic F.C. players
Kingstonian F.C. players
Aldershot Town F.C. players
English Football League players
National League (English football) players
Isthmian League players
Cray Wanderers F.C. players
Tonbridge Angels F.C. players
Merstham F.C. players
Haringey Borough F.C. players
Harlow Town F.C. players
Burgess Hill Town F.C. players
Whyteleafe F.C. players